Zimnochy  is a village in the administrative district of Gmina Godkowo, within Elbląg County, Warmian-Masurian Voivodeship, in northern Poland.

In the years 1975-1998 the town administratively belonged to the Elbląg province .

References

Zimnochy